Joël Zangerlé (born 11 October 1988) is a Luxembourgian former professional racing cyclist.

Major results

2005
 3rd Time trial, National Junior Road Championships
2006
 3rd Road race, National Junior Road Championships
2010
 1st  Road race, National Under-23 Road Championships
2013
 1st  Road race, Games of the Small States of Europe
 6th Overall Flèche du Sud
 8th Overall Circuit des Ardennes
 10th Omloop der Kempen
2014
 2nd Overall Flèche du Sud
 10th Overall Oberösterreich Rundfahrt
2015
 9th Velothon Wales

References

External links

1988 births
Living people
Luxembourgian male cyclists
People from Ettelbruck
European Games competitors for Luxembourg
Cyclists at the 2015 European Games